× Graphiella, abbreviated in trade journals Grpla, is an intergeneric hybrid between the orchid genera Cymbidiella and Graphorkis (Cymla × Grks).

References 

Eulophiinae
Orchid nothogenera